Bend the Arc: A Jewish Partnership for Justice is a progressive Jewish political organization that blends advocacy, community organizing, and leadership training. The organization advocates for a more equal and just society, focusing strictly on domestic issues.  Bend the Arc does not deal with issues related to Israel.

Positions
Bend the Arc has been noted for its work protesting the policies of the administration of U.S. President Donald Trump. Leaders of the organizations have argued that Trump has emboldened white nationalism, and disrupted an October 2019 speech by Trump in Pittsburgh by chanting "Trump Endangered Jews."

According to a profile of the group published by Tablet Magazine, they claim "to speak for American Jewry," though Bend the Arc spokesperson Logan Smith admits the group has "no active dues-paying members who participate in the shaping of their agenda."

Leadership 
Stosh Cotler became Bend the Arc's Executive Vice President in 2011 and CEO in 2014. When Cotler became CEO, The Forward noted that she was "one of the few women leading a national Jewish group of its size."

History 
The Progressive Jewish Alliance (PJA) was founded in 1999 by Douglas Mirell, Steven Kaplan and Joan Patsy Ostroy, after the closure of the Los Angeles chapter of the American Jewish Congress. They sought to assert a Jewish interest in the campaigns for social justice in Southern California, which has the United States' second largest Jewish population. Progressive Jewish Alliance expanded in February 2005 by opening a San Francisco Bay Area chapter. The PJA stated goals are social justice, judicial reform, and improved working conditions. They also try to facilitate dialogue between non-violent young offenders and their victims and between Jews and Muslims.

PJA ran the Jeremiah Fellowship, which trains young Jews to be future social justice leaders. In addition, the PJA conducted education programs and quarterly holiday events on the intersection of art, culture and politics.

On June 1, 2011, the Progressive Jewish Alliance merged with Jewish Funds for Justice (JFSJ), and the consolidated group adopted the name Bend the Arc in 2012.

References

External links 
 

Jewish charities based in the United States
Jewish-American political organizations
Social justice organizations
Liberalism and religion
Progressive organizations in the United States
Organizations established in 1999
1999 establishments in California